The National Institute for Medical Research (commonly abbreviated to NIMR), was a medical research institute based in Mill Hill, on the outskirts of north London, England. It was funded by the Medical Research Council (MRC);

In 2016, the NIMR became part of the new Francis Crick Institute, which was constructed next to St Pancras railway station in the Camden area of central London.

History

Foundation

The Medical Research Council, founded in 1913, was immediately charged with establishing a central research institute in London. Later that year, premises at Hampstead were acquired and the National Institute for Medical Research was founded.

However, the outbreak of World War I soon afterwards delayed occupation of the building, although senior staff were appointed and began work. By 1920 the institute at Mount Vernon Hospital was fully operational and remained so for 30 years until the move to Mill Hill. The original institute, under the directorship of Sir Henry Dale, had three divisions:
 Bacteriology
 Biochemistry and Pharmacology
 Applied Physiology

Dale oversaw a period of considerable success at NIMR, including the discovery of the human influenza virus in 1933 and the discovery of the neurotransmitter acetylcholine, for which Dale himself received the 1936 Nobel Prize in Physiology or Medicine.

Moving to Mill Hill

In the 1930s, the decision was made to move the institute to new premises. An imposing copper-roofed building at Mill Hill was designed by Maxwell Ayrton, the architect of the original Wembley Stadium, and construction began in 1937. Occupation was delayed when war broke out in 1939 and the building was given to the Women's Royal Naval Service. The building was returned to the MRC in autumn 1949 but Dale had retired in 1942 and so was never director on the new site, that job falling to his successor Sir Charles Harington.

The official opening ceremony took place on 5 May 1950, with King George VI and Queen Elizabeth present. Harington expanded the research programme into ten divisions during his 20-year tenure and guided researchers at the institute to, amongst other achievements, the development of gas chromatography and the discovery of interferon. From 1950 to 1955 Albert Neuberger was Head of Biochemistry at the institute.

In 1962, Nobel Prize winner Sir Peter Medawar became director and, consistent with his research interests, established NIMR as a major centre for immunological research. Following an illness, Medawar retired as director in 1971 to be replaced by Sir Arnold Burgen. Burgen had an interest in nuclear magnetic resonance techniques and formed the MRC Biomedical NMR Centre at the institute in 1980. Sir Dai Rees became director in 1982 to be replaced by Sir John Skehel in 1987.

2000 to present

In 2003, as part of their Forward Investment Strategy, the MRC announced plans to consider moving NIMR from its location in Mill Hill to a university/medical school site, to enhance its ability "to translate its biomedical research into practical health outcomes."
 University College London was selected as a preferred partner institution, and a nearby site in central London was acquired.

Some staff at the NIMR, including Robin Lovell-Badge and Skehel, expressed opposition to a move. In response to accusations of "coercion" during the review process, a House of Commons select committee investigation criticised both the MRC for losing the confidence of NIMR workers, and unnamed NIMR staff for "undermining [Colin] Blakemore's position as MRC chief executive."

In September 2006, Skehel retired as NIMR director  and Sir Keith Peters became acting director  until the future structure of the new institute could be finalised. In July of that year the MRC announced that Scott Fraser of the California Institute of Technology had been invited to take over the directorship. According to Blakemore, negotiations were ongoing as of December 2006. However, finally, in October 2008, Jim Smith of the Gurdon Institute, University of Cambridge (who worked at the NIMR from 1984 to 2000), accepted the directorship, with effect from January 2009.

On 1 April 2015, the NIMR became part of the new Francis Crick Institute and ceased to exist as a separate MRC institute. The site at Mill Hill was fully vacated and closed for redevelopment during 2017.

In 2018 demolition of the building began, to make way for new homes.

Activities

Mill Hill Essays
A yearly collection of essays is produced by guest authors and staff at the institute, under the title Mill Hill Essays. They are written to be accessible and informative to the lay reader.

Notable staff
 Gordon Ada AO FAA (1922–2012), Australian biochemist
 Rudolf K. Allemann, Swiss biological chemist
 Brigitte Askonas FMedSci FRS, (1923–2013), immunologist
 Brigid Balfour (1914–1994), immunologist
 Frank Hawking OX (1940–1970) parasitologist
 Rosa Beddington FRS (1956–2001), developmental biologist
 Hilda Bruce (1903–1974), zoologist, discoverer of the Bruce effect
 Sir Frank Macfarlane Burnet  (1899–1985), Australian virologist and immunologist, 1960 Nobel Prize for predicting acquired immune tolerance
 G. Marius Clore FRS (born 1955) –  Pioneer of multidimensional macromolecular NMR spectroscopy laying foundations of 3D structure determination of proteins in solution, and discovery of rare, invisible conformational states of macromolecules. Member of the United States National Academy of Sciences.
 Sir Henry Hallett Dale OM GBE PRS, pharmacologist and physiologist and 1936 Nobel Prize in Physiology or Medicine
 Guy Dodson FRS FMedSci (1937–2012), biochemist
 Florence Margaret Durham (1869–1948), geneticist
 Sir David Evans FRS (1909–1984), microbiologist
 Wilhelm Feldberg CBE FRS (1900–1993), German-British physiologist and biologist
 Sir Charles Robert Harington FRS (1897–1972), chemist, best known for synthesizing thyroxine
 Sir Charles Arthur Lovatt Evans FRS (1884–1968), physiologist
 Cecil Hoare  FRS (1892–1984), British protozoologist and parasitologist
 Brigid Hogan FRS, developmental biologist
 Alick Isaacs FRS (1921–1967), virologist, best known for his co-discovery of interferon at the National Institute in 1957
 Charles Kellaway MC FRS (1889–1952),  Australian medical researcher and science administrator
 Jean Lindenmann (1924–2015), Swiss virologist, co-discovered interferon in 1957 with Dr. Alick Isaacs at the National Institute for Medical Research
 Mary C. Lobban (1922–1982), physiologist who studied circadian rhythms
 Robin Lovell-Badge FRS, geneticist most noted for his discovery of the SRY gene in mammals
 Archer John Porter Martin FRS (1910–2002), chemist, 1952 Nobel Prize in Chemistry for the invention of partition chromatography
 Dame Anne McLaren DBE FRS FRCOG (1927–2007), developmental biologist
 Sir Peter Medawar OM CBE FRS (1915–1987), biologist, 1960 Nobel Prize in Physiology or Medicine with Sir Frank Macfarlane Burnet
 Marjorie Mussett (1922–2004), biologist and endocrinologist
 Indira Nath (born 1938), Indian immunologist
 Albert Neuberger CBE FRS  FRCP (1908–1996) pathologist
 Janet Niven (1902–1974), histologist and pathologist
 Anne O'Garra FRS, immunologist
 Dame Bridget Ogilvie AC DBE FRS (born 1938), Australian and British scientist
 Delphine Parrott (born 1928), endocrinologist and immunologist
 Rosalind Pitt-Rivers FRS (1907–1990), biochemist
 Christopher Polge CBE FRS (1926–2006), biologist, most noted for his work in cryopreservation
 Rodney Robert Porter FRS (1917–1985), biochemist and Nobel Laureate
 Elizabeth Press (1920–2008), immunologist
 Sir John Skehel FRS (born  1941) virologist
 Audrey Smith (1915–1981), cryobiologist
 Geoffrey L. Smith FRS FMedSci (born 1955), virologist
 Jonathan P. Stoye, virologist
 Dame Janet Thornton DBE FRS (born 1949), Director of the European Bioinformatics Institute
 Saul Tendler Fellow of the Royal Pharmaceutical Society and Deputy Vice Chancellor of the University of York (born 1961)
 Anne Warner FRS, biologist
 Hélio Gelli Pereira FRS (1918–1994), virologist

In fiction
The rooms and other locations in the building were used in the film Batman Begins, for the Arkham Asylum scenes.

The location was also used in Episode 2, Series 2 of the Channel 4 comedy series, 'Toast of London' to double as a tax office with the character of Ray Purchase seen entering the building.

See also
 National Institute for Biological Standards and Control

References

External links
 The NIMR Website
 Mill Hill Essays
 Plans for largest biomedical research facility in Europe unveiled (The Guardian)

Medical Research Council (United Kingdom)
Medical research institutes in the United Kingdom
Mill Hill
National Influenza Centres
Research institutes established in 1913
Research institutes in London
1913 establishments in the United Kingdom